The Liberal Network for Latin America,, abbreviated to RELIAL, is a network of 42 liberal institutions from 17 Latin American countries. Members of RELIAL include political parties as well as think tanks, foundations and research institutes. Most of the members tend to economic liberalism. RELIAL is the regional organization of the Liberal International.

It was founded in 2003 with the official launch taking place in Costa Rica November, 2004.

Members

Full Members

Associate Members

References

External links
  
  Hispanic American Liberal Conference CLH official site

International liberal organizations